Scottsville Road is a major four-lane undivided thoroughfare in Bowling Green, in Warren County in south-central Kentucky.

The road is often known as the busiest roadway in Bowling Green as heavy traffic volumes often use the road, especially with the presence of several businesses of all kinds, including Greenwood Mall. The heavy traffic on Scottsville Road is often a daily issue, even with the presence of the former William H. Natcher Parkway extension (now KY 9007), which opened in 2013.

Intersections 
All traffic signals within Bowling Green city limits are numbered.

See also

References

External links
Bowling Green Area Convention and Visitors Bureau
Kentucky Transportation Cabinet
US 231 at KentuckyRoads.com

U.S. Route 231
U.S. Highways in Kentucky
Streets in Bowling Green, Kentucky
Transportation in Warren County, Kentucky